Dustin Brooks is a character of two TV series:

 Dustin Brooks (Power Rangers Ninja Storm) from Power Rangers Ninja Storm.
 Dustin Brooks (Zoey 101) from Zoey 101.